The Taumarunui by-election of 1915 was a by-election during the 18th New Zealand Parliament in the  electorate. It was held on the 15 June 1915. The seat had become vacant in May 1915 when incumbent Taumarunui MP's William Jennings' election the previous year was declared void. Jennings stood again and successfully retained his seat.

Results
The following table gives the election results:

References

Taumarunui 1915
1915 elections in New Zealand
June 1915 events
Politics of Manawatū-Whanganui